Anegundi Raj is one of the most important estate in the then Bellary district, British Raj, present in the Gangavathi taluk, Koppal district in the Indian state of Karnataka. After the downfall of the glorious Vijayanagara Empire at Chandragiri, the last emperor Sri Ranga III named Rama Raya recovered some part of his ancestral dominion and retained Anegundi, part of Chitaldurgam and part of Harpanahalli as a jagir from the Mohammedan government.

Origin 
Originally they belonged to the Aravidu dynasty, ( the fourth dynasty that ruled Vijayanagara Empire). The daughter of Krishnadevaraya was married to Aliya Rama Raya and thus the empire passed in to them.

Estate Management 
The Jagirdars of anegundi enjoyed the estate under the Mughal Empire till 1749 and later under the Marathas till 1775 when Tippu sultan over ran the then Raja Timmappa and burnt the town of Anegundi.

After tippu's action the raja fled to Nizam dominions, where he stayed a fugitive till 1791 and then again in 1799 recaptured his estate back. Later English handed over the estate to Nizam and the raja turned out to be the pensioner and were termed the Raja of Anegundi.

Raja's of Anegundi 
1.) Sri Ranga IV (1665-1678)
2.) Venkatapathi (1678-1680)
3.) Sri Ranga (1680-1692)
4.) Venkata Raya (1692-1706)
5.) Sri Ranga Raya (1706-1716)
6.) Mahadevaraya (1716-1724)
7.) Sri Ranga Raya (1724-1729)
8.) Venkata Raya (1729-1732)
9.) Rama (1732-1739)
10.) Venkatapati Raya (1739-1744)
11.) Timmappa
12.) Venkatapati (1791-1793)
After 1802 settlement
13.) Tirumala Raja
14.) -
15.) Grand Daughter of Tirumala Raja.
16.) Tirumala Deva ( Her son)
17.) Venkata Rama Raya ( First son of Tirumala Deva )
18.) Krishnadevaraya ( Second son of Tirumala Deva )
19.) Narasimha Raja ( Third son of Tirumala Deva) 
(The above list is given by Robert Sewell in 1883).

References 

Zamindari estates
History of Andhra Pradesh
Madras Presidency